Henry George Strauss, 1st Baron Conesford, QC (24 June 1892 – 28 August 1974) was a British lawyer and a Conservative politician.

Background and education
He was born at 19 Pembridge Gardens, Kensington, London, on 24 June 1892. He was the only son of Alphonse Henry Strauss, general merchant, and his wife, Hedwig Aschrott. He was educated at Rugby and Christ Church, Oxford, and was called to the Bar, Inner Temple, in 1919.
He briefly served during World War I, but was discharged because of health problems and continued working in Whitehall.

Political career
Strauss sat as Member of Parliament for Norwich between 1935 and 1945, for the Combined English Universities between 1946 and 1950 and for Norwich South between 1950 and 1955. He was Parliamentary Private Secretary (PPS) to the Attorney General, Sir Donald Somervell, between 1936 and 1942 and a government member as Parliamentary Secretary to the Ministry of Works between March and December 1942 and as Parliamentary Secretary to the Ministry of Town and Country Planning between 1942 and 1945, when he resigned from the government in protest at Churchill's treatment of Poland at the Yalta agreement. He was once again a government member as Parliamentary Secretary to the Board of Trade under Churchill between 1951 and 1955. The latter year he was raised to the peerage as Baron Conesford, of Chelsea in the County of London.

In 1946 he published the book Trade Unions and the Law connected with treatment of Poland by Yalta agreements.
From 1964 - 1970 he was the Chairman of the Association of Independent Unionist Peers. He also was the President of the Architectural club.

Lord Conesford became a King's Counsel in 1964 and a Bencher of the Inner Temple in 1969. He was also a member of the governors of Norwich High School for Girls and a vice-president of the Girls' Day School Trust. He was well known for his speeches in which he complained about the improper usages of the English language, especially in the United States, as can be seen in a Time magazine article from 1957.

Personal life
Lord Conesford married Anne Sadelbia Mary, daughter of Bowyer Nichols, in 1927. He died in August 1974, aged 82, when the barony became extinct.

References

External links 
 

Strauss, Henry George
Strauss, Henry George
Strauss, Henry George
English barristers
Jewish British politicians
Strauss, Henry
Ministers in the Churchill wartime government, 1940–1945
Parliamentary Secretaries to the Board of Trade
Politicians from London
Presidents of the Girls' Day School Trust
Strauss, Henry G
Strauss, Henry G
Strauss, Henry G
Strauss, Henry G
UK MPs who were granted peerages
Ministers in the third Churchill government, 1951–1955
20th-century English lawyers
Hereditary barons created by Elizabeth II